The 11th Pennsylvania Infantry Regiment was a Union army regiment that participated in the American Civil War. It had the distinction of being the oldest unit in continuous service from Pennsylvania.

History
The 11th Pennsylvania was recruited from several counties in Pennsylvania as a three-month regiment on April 26, 1861, and sent to Camp Curtin, Harrisburg for training and organization. Phaon Jarrett served as its first colonel, with Richard Coulter as lieutenant colonel and William D. Earnest as major. It was assigned to Robert Patterson's Army of the Shenandoah. The regiment received the nickname "The Bloody Eleventh" at the Battle of Hoke's Run, Virginia, July 2, 1861.

The 11th was reorganized as a three-year regiment in the August of the same year at Camp Curtin in Harrisburg. After a few weeks of drill, the regiment was given garrison duty at Annapolis, Maryland. In April, it was moved to Mannassas Junction, where it guarded the railroad. It was again transferred, this time to the Shenandoah Valley, in late May as part of Irvin McDowell's Corps. They fought in the Battles of Cedar Mountain and Second Bull Run.

After the Army of Virginia was merged into the Army of the Potomac, the reconstituted regiment became part of the I Corps. At Turner's Gap at the Battle of South Mountain, the 11th came under light fire only, losing two men wounded. At the Battle of Antietam three days later, it was heavily engaged on the Union right around the West Woods. In this battle, it lost 27 killed, 89 wounded, and two captured.

When the original three-year enlistment period expired in January 1864, many of the men re-enrolled in the regiment at the influence of Brig. Gen. Richard Coulter, a former colonel of the regiment. Because of this, the unit was designated "veteran volunteers." During the reorganization of the Army in the spring of 1864, the 11th became part of the V Corps, as the old I Corps had been disbanded, and surviving units transferred to the V Corps.

The 11th fought in multiple battles in the Eastern Theater, including Second Bull Run, Antietam, Chancellorsville, Gettysburg, Grant's Overland Campaign, the Siege of Petersburg, and the Appomattox Campaign. It was mustered out on July 1, 1865. 

A total of 1,890 men served in the regiment during the war, and only 340 men were discharged at war's end. 

Among the numerous casualties was one that would stand out as an undying remembrance of the unit and its loyalty to the cause. The regiment's beloved mascot, Sallie Ann Jarrett, "a brindle, bull-terrier"> similar to today's American Staffordshire Terrier, traveled everywhere with the unit. "Sallie" was said to have hated three things — Rebels, Democrats, and Women. Her loyalty was undying, for at Gettysburg, after the battle on the First Day was over, Sallie, tired and hungry, ambled out to where her brave comrades had fought and died. She lay down with the dead, until she was found, weak and close to death herself, on July 4, 1863.  Her friends nursed her back to health, and she fought with the unit in every battle until she was mortally wounded at Hatcher's Run in February 1865. Although under a "murderous fire," several of the men gave her a proper burial where she fell. Never forgetting the most devoted member of their regiment, in 1890 the veterans of the 11th forever memorialized her by placing her bronze likeness on their monument on Oak Ridge in the Gettysburg National Military Park.

Casualties:
 Killed and mortally wounded: 12 officers, 224 enlisted men
 Wounded: ? officers, ? enlisted men
 Died of disease: 4 officers, 177 enlisted men
 Captured or missing: ? officers, ? enlisted men
 Total casualties: ? officers, ? enlisted men

Notable members
The 11th Pennsylvania was commanded for most of its service by Colonel Richard Coulter.

Two of the regiment's men were awarded the Medal of Honor, both for capturing battle flags. Private George W. Reed earned his at the Battle of Globe Tavern on August 21, 1864, and Sergeant Hiram H. De Lavie at the Battle of Five Forks on April 1, 1865.

William Henry Locke, the regimental chaplain, later wrote a history of the 11th Pennsylvania.

Reenactors
Company A, 11th Pennsylvania Volunteer Infantry, is based in central Pennsylvania. A family oriented authentic progressive unit and part of 4th Regiment, Federal Volunteer Brigade.

See also

List of Pennsylvania Civil War Units

Footnotes

Citations

References

External links

 Sunbury Guards (Company F, 11th Pennsylvania Volunteers and Later History), 47th Pennsylvania Volunteers: One Civil War Regiment's Story
Reenactors of the 11th Pennsylvania Volunteer Infantry

Units and formations of the Union Army from Pennsylvania
1861 establishments in Pennsylvania
Military units and formations established in 1861
Military units and formations disestablished in 1865